Sēlpils is a village in Sēlpils Parish, Jēkabpils Municipality in the Selonia region of Latvia, about 9 km from the historical Sēlpils hillfort, where the village of Vecsēlpils ("old Sēlpils") is located now.

References 

Villages in Latvia
Jēkabpils Municipality
Friedrichstadt County
Selonia